Matěj Pechman (24 May 1893 – 24 October 1973) was a Czech equestrian. He competed at the 1924 Summer Olympics and the 1936 Summer Olympics.

References

External links
 

1893 births
1973 deaths
Czech male equestrians
Czech dressage riders
Olympic equestrians of Czechoslovakia
Equestrians at the 1924 Summer Olympics
Equestrians at the 1936 Summer Olympics
Sportspeople from Plzeň